Jon Ander López Maquiera (6 September 1976 – 6 January 2013), known as Jon Ander in his playing days, was a Spanish footballer who played as a goalkeeper.

Club career
Born in Barakaldo, Basque Country, Jon Ander played his first seasons as a senior with modest clubs in his native region. In summer 1998 he joined SD Eibar, going on to play two Segunda División seasons with the team.

Jon Ander was part of Real Valladolid's roster in several La Liga campaigns, but never appeared in the competition during his spell, also being loaned to Levante UD in the second level. Released by the former in June 2004, he played one season with UD Salamanca in division two, then saw out his remaining career in the lower leagues.

Late into the season where Lucena CF would eventually achieve promotion to Segunda División B for the first time ever, López retired from football at the age of only 30, immediately becoming the Andalusian club's president. On 6 January 2013, four years after leaving his post, the 36-year-old died suddenly from a heart attack while in Sestao.

References

External links

1976 births
2013 deaths
Spanish footballers
Footballers from Barakaldo
Association football goalkeepers
Segunda División players
Segunda División B players
Tercera División players
Rayo Cantabria players
CD Basconia footballers
Barakaldo CF footballers
SD Eibar footballers
Real Valladolid players
Levante UD footballers
UD Salamanca players
Real Jaén footballers
Écija Balompié players
Lucena CF players
Spanish football chairmen and investors